is a town located in Kuma District, Kumamoto Prefecture, Japan.

As of April 2017, the town has an estimated population of 15,796. The total area is 159.49 km2.

Asagiri was created by the merger of 5 smaller towns and villages on April 1, 2003.  Those included the town of Menda, and the villages of Ōkaharu, Ue, Sue and Fukada, all from Kuma District.
Soybeans, strawberries, melons and tobacco are also produced here.

Asagiri is in the Kuma District region where shōchū, a popular rice alcohol is produced and consumed.

The village of Sue (now part of Asagiri) was the topic of a 1939 text, Suye Mura, a Japanese Village by John Embree.

The word "asagiri" translates as "morning mist".

Geography
Mt. Shiragatake is a designated nature reserve.
 Mountains: Shiragatake
 Rivers: Kuma river

Adjacent municipalities
 Kumamoto prefecture:
Nishiki town
Taragi town
Sagara village
Miyazaki prefecture
Ebino city

Area names
Names inside the parenthesis are the old village names before the merger in 2003.

 East Ue – Uehigashi (Uemura, Ueko)
 North Ue – Uekita (Uemura, Ueotsu)
 South Ue – Ueminami (Uemura, Uehei)
 West Ue – Uenishi (Uemura, Uetei)
 Minagoe (Ue village, Minagoe)
 North Okaharu – Okaharukita (Okaharumura, Miyahara)
 South Okaharu – Okaharuminami (Okaharumura, Okamoto)
 Sue (Sue village)
 North Fukada – Fukadakita (Fukadamura)
 West Fukada (Fukadamura)
 East Fukada (Fukadamura)
 South Fukada (Fukadamura)
 East Menda (Mendamachi-ko)
 West Menda (Mendamachi-otsu)

Climate
Asagiri has a humid subtropical climate (Köppen climate classification Cfa) with hot, humid summers and cool winters. There is significant precipitation throughout the year, especially during June and July.

Demographics
Per Japanese census data, the population of Asagiri in 2020 is 14,676 people. Asagiri has been conducting censuses since 1920.

History

Development
 April 1, 1889: The towns and villages became designated areas.
 Within Kuma district: Ue village, Minagoe village, Menda village, Okaharu village, Sue village, and Fukada village
 December 7, 1895: Minagoe village was incorporated into Ue village
 April 1, 1937: Menda village became Menda town (Menda machi)
 April 1, 2003: The Kuma district villages of Ue, Okaharu, Sue, Fukada and town of Menda merged to create Asagiri-town. The name was chosen because for the fog that blankets the valley from fall through spring.(Asa – morning, kiri/giri – fog)

Government

Mayor
First mayor: Indou Takuichiro: April 27, 2003 – April 26, 2007
Second mayor: Aikou Kazunori: April 27, 2007 – incumbent, second term

Economy
As of 2004, the total town production was 430 billion yen.

References

External links

Official website  updated: February 2019

Towns in Kumamoto Prefecture